Ironweed or iron weed may refer to:

 Ironweed (novel), a 1983 novel by William Kennedy
 Ironweed (film), a 1987 adaptation of Kennedy's novel

Plants
 many species of genus Vernonia
 Cyanthillium cinereum, little ironweed
 Verbesina alternifolia, yellow ironweed

See also 
 Ironwood (disambiguation)